Dmitri Borisovv may refer to:
 Dmitry Borisov (anchorman) (born 1985), Russian TV and radio personality
 Dmitri Borisov (footballer, born 1977), Russian football player
 Dmitri Borisov (footballer, born 1996), Russian football player
 Dzmitry Barysaw (born 1995), Belarusian football player